The High Priest of Ra or of Re was known in Egyptian as the wr-mꜢw, which translates as Greatest of Seers.

The main cult of Ra was in ancient Heliopolis, northeast of present-day Cairo. The high priests of Ra are not as well documented as the high priests of other deities such as Amun and Ptah.

Old Kingdom
Old Kingdom (c. 2686 BCE – 2181 BCE)
 Imhotep, time of Djoser, Third Dynasty
 Prince Rahotep, possibly son of Sneferu, Fourth Dynasty

Middle Kingdom
Middle Kingdom (c. 2055 BCE–1550 BCE)
 Nubkaura-ankh, from offering table and rock inscription
 Khakaureemhat, papyrus from Lahun
 Maakherure-emhutaat, seal
 Ra, seal
 Khentyhetep Iyemiatib, seal
 Iuefsenef, seal

New Kingdom
New Kingdom (c. 1550 BCE–1069 BCE)
Eighteenth Dynasty
 Ahmose, son of Amenhotep II. Served during the reign of Thutmose IV
 Pawah served during the reign of Akhenaten
Nineteenth Dynasty
 Bak (High Priest of Re) Bak was a royal charioteer and later high priest of Re.
 Amenemope, son of the high priest of Amun, Parennefer called Wennefer
 Meryatum son of Ramesses II and Nefertari
 Rahotep served as Vizier as well as high priest of Re during the reign of Ramesses II.
Twentieth Dynasty
 Meryatum II served during the Twentieth Dynasty
 Nebmaatre, likely a son of Ramesses IX

High Priests of Ra archaeological elements

The Al-Masalla area of the Al-Matariyyah district, the site of Heliopolis, contains the underground tombs of High Priests of Re of the Sixth Dynasty (2345 BCE—2181 BCE), which were found in the southeast corner of the great Temple of Re—Atum archaeological site.  The ancient Masalla Obelisk, or El-Misalla  (trans. obelisk), in Al-Matariyyah is the only surviving element standing of the Re—Atum Temple, constructed by Pharaoh Senusret I (1971 BCE—1926 BCE) of the Twelfth Dynasty.

References

 
.
Ancient Egyptian titles